Max Valier is a  X-ray telescopic satellite which was built in a collaboration by the Gewerbeoberschule "Max Valier" Bozen, the Gewerbeoberschule "Oskar von Miller" Meran and the Amateurastronomen "Max Valier". The Max Planck Institute for Astrophysics provides the small X-ray telescope µRosi, which allows amateur astronomers for the first time to see the sky in X-ray wavelength. It was launched with help of the OHB in Germany by an Indian PSLV-C38 rocket on June 23, 2017.

References

Spacecraft launched in 2017
Space telescopes
X-ray telescopes
Spacecraft launched by PSLV rockets
Satellites of Italy
2017 in Italy
Nanosatellites